The Regional Affairs Committee, previously known as the Standing Committee on Regional Affairs, is a general committee of the House of Commons of the United Kingdom that considers any matter related to regional affairs in England that may be referred to it. The Committee comprises thirteen MPs from English constituencies, although any MP representing an English constituency may participate in its debates. In that it is similar to the Northern Ireland, Scottish, and Welsh Grand Committees. Also like those committees, provision is made for it to meet away from Westminster.

The Committee was created in 2000, but has not met since June 2004, and no members were appointed during the 2005/10 Parliament. On 27 May 2010, the Leader of the House of Commons, Sir George Young, said that the Government would not reintroduce the regional select committees, which considered matters relevant to each English region, and would announce its plans for the Regional Grand Committees in due course. It was not clear whether the fate of the Regional Affairs Committee would be announced at the same time; however, Young did question its necessity when he was an Opposition backbencher.

See also
List of committees of the United Kingdom Parliament

References

Committees of the British House of Commons